Melita Ruhn (later Fleischer, born 19 April 1965) is a retired Romanian artistic gymnast who represented Romania at the 1980 Summer Olympics. She belongs to the German minority in Romania.
She won three Olympic medals (team, vault, uneven bars) for Romania and scored a perfect ten for the vault optionals in the team competition of the 1980 Olympic Games. In 1979 she was a member of the first world gold medal-winning team of Romania. She is also an all around and floor world bronze medalist.

Career
Ruhn took up gymnastics aged seven at Sport School Club Sibiu coached by Ana Crihan and Adrian Goreac. Later she trained with the national team in Deva under coach Béla Károlyi. Her first major international competition was the 1979 European Championships in Copenhagen where she placed fifth in the all-around final event.

Together with Nadia Comăneci, Rodica Dunca, Emilia Eberle, Dumitriţa Turner and Marilena Vlădărău, Ruhn was a member of the gold-winning team at the 1979 World Artistic Gymnastics Championships. This was the first time that Romania won the team event at the world championships and the second time the Soviet team had not won the world or the Olympic title since 1952. Melita did all the four events and contributed with a difficult and risky routine on the uneven bars. Individually she won the bronze medals in the all around and in the floor event and placed seventh on vault and eighth on balance beam.

In 1980 she was a member of the silver-winning Romanian team at the 1980 Olympic Games. She revealed for a newspaper that just before the Moscow Olympics she fractured her ankle. The ankle was put in a cast, and coach Károlyi took it off before the vault event.  She scored a 10 and the cast was placed back on her ankle. Besides winning silver with the team she won the bronze medal on vault and on uneven bars. The bronze on the uneven bars was a tie with Steffi Kräker and Maria Filatova.

Post retirement
Ruhn retired from competitive gymnastics in 1982, when she was 17. She finished high school in her native Sibiu and left for Bucharest in 1984. She went to the sports university there, while also competing for her home club of CSS Sibiu for a short period. After she graduated from college, she had a boyfriend, who emigrated to Germany with his family in 1988. They wanted to get married but the Romanian communist government only gave them their approval two years later, so she only managed to leave Romania in 1990. In Germany she stayed for the first three months in a refugee camp near Nürnberg sharing the same room with six people.  Then she was allowed to move in together with her boyfriend. The former gymnast started working as a custodian.

Competitive history

References

External links

 
 Profile on Romanian-Gymnastics.com
 
 
 

1965 births
Living people
Sportspeople from Sibiu
Romanian female artistic gymnasts
Gymnasts at the 1980 Summer Olympics
Olympic gymnasts of Romania
Olympic silver medalists for Romania
Olympic bronze medalists for Romania
Olympic medalists in gymnastics
Medalists at the 1980 Summer Olympics
Medalists at the World Artistic Gymnastics Championships